Four referendums were held in Switzerland during 1954. The first two were held on 20 June on a federal resolution on concessions for shoemakers, saddlers, barbers and wainwrights and a federal resolution on assistance for war-affected Swiss citizens living abroad. Both were rejected by voters. The third was held on 24 October on a federal resolution on financial order between 1955 and 1958, and was approved by 70% of voters. The fourth was held on 5 December on a popular initiative for the "protection of the Stromlandschaft and concession Rheinau", and was rejected by 69% of voters.

Results

June: Concessions for some industries

June: Assistance for the war-affected

October: Financial order

December: Popular initiative

References

1954 referendums
1954 in Switzerland
Referendums in Switzerland